Lanistes is a genus of freshwater snails which have a gill and an operculum, aquatic gastropod mollusks in the family Ampullariidae, the apple snails.

Distribution 
The distribution of the genus Lanistes includes Africa and Madagascar.

Description 
Lanistes has a unique anatomy among the Ampullariidae: it has a "hyperstrophic" sinistral shell. This means that the body of the snail is dextral (as in all other ampullariids), but the shell appears to be sinistral. However the sinistral appearance stems from the fact that the rotation of the shell as it grows is in an upward direction rather than the usual downward direction.

Species
Three subgenera have been recognized, based on shell differences: Lanistes sensu stricto, Meladomus and Leroya. These subgenera are not used in recent works.

Extant species within the genus Lanistes include:
 Lanistes alexandri (Bourguignat, 1889)
 Lanistes ambiguus Martens, 1866
 Lanistes bernardianus (Morelet, 1860)
 Lanistes beseneckeri Schütt in Schütt & Besenecker, 1973 †
 Lanistes bicarinatus Germain, 1907
 Lanistes bloyeti (Bourguignat, 1889)
 Lanistes boltenianus (Röding, 1798) - synonym: Lanistes carinatus (Olivier, 1804) 
 Lanistes chaperi (Kobelt, 1912)
 Lanistes ciliatus Martens, 1878
 Lanistes congicus O. Boettger, 1891
 Lanistes deguerryanus (Bourguignat, 1889)
 Lanistes ellipticus Martens, 1866
 Lanistes farleri Craven, 1880
 Lanistes fultoni (Kobelt, 1912)
 Lanistes grasseti (Morelet, 1863)
 Lanistes graueri Thiele, 1911
 Lanistes intortus Martens, 1877
 Lanistes jouberti (Bourguignat, 1888)
 Lanistes letourneuxi (Bourguignat, 1879)
 Lanistes libycus (Morelet, 1848)
 Lanistes libycus var. albersi
 Lanistes libycus form bernardianus or as Lanistes bernardianus (Morelet, 1860)
 Lanistes magnus Furtado, 1886
 Lanistes nasutus Mandahl-Barth, 1972
 Lanistes neavei Melvill & Standen, 1907
 Lanistes neritoides Brown & Berthold, 1990
 Lanistes nitidissimus (Bourguignat, 1889)
 Lanistes nsendweensis (Dupuis & Putzeys, 1901)
 Lanistes nyassanus Dohrn, 1865
 Lanistes ovatus (Olivier, 1804)
 Lanistes ovum Peters in Troschel, 1845 - synonyms: Lanistes magnus Furtado; Lanistes olivaceus (Sowerby); Lanistes procerus; Lanistes elatior Martens, 1866; Lanistes ovum bangweolicus Haas, 1936; Lanistes connollyi Pain, 1954 Lanistes ovum adansoni; Lanistes olivaceus var. ambiguus
 Lanistes palustris (Morelet, 1864)
 Lanistes pfeifferi (Bourguignat, 1879)
 Lanistes pilsbryi Walker, 1925
 Lanistes pseudoceratodes (Wenz, 1928)
 Lanistes purpureus (Jonas, 1839)
 Lanistes solidus Smith, 1877
 Lanistes stuhlmanni Martens, 1897
 Lanistes varicus (Müller, 1774) - synonyms: Lanistes adansoni Kobelt, 1911; Lanistes millestriatus Pilsbry & Bequaert, 1927

Fossil species within the genus Lanistes include:
 † Lanistes asellus van Damme & Pickford, 1995
 † Lanistes bishopi Gautier

 † Lanistes gautieri van Damme & Pickford, 1995
 † Lanistes gigas van Damme & Pickford, 1995
 † Lanistes hadotoi van Damme & Pickford, 1995
 † Lanistes heynderycxi van Damme & Pickford, 1995

 † Lanistes nkondoensis van Damme & Pickford, 1995
 † Lanistes olukaensis

 † Lanistes senuti van Damme & Pickford, 1995
 † Lanistes trochiformis van Damme & Pickford, 1995

References

External links 
 Animation showing how the "hyperstrophic" sinistral shell evolved from a shell with normal orientation
 Schultheiß R., Van Bocxlaer B., Wilke T. & Albrecht C. (2009). "Old fossils–young species: evolutionary history of an endemic gastropod assemblage in Lake Malawi". Proceedings of the Royal Society B 276(1668): 2837-2846. .

Ampullariidae
Taxonomy articles created by Polbot